You've Got A Friend is the eighth album from American gospel music artist Susie Luchsinger. It was released on 2003 on New Haven Records.

Track listing
"Wonderful, Merciful Savior"  - 4:01
"Have I Told You Lately" (Van Morrison)
"How Sweet It Is" (Holland-Dozier-Holland)  - 3:32
"You've Got A Friend" (Carole King)
"Lean On Me" (Bill Withers)
"The Little Girl"
"There Is A Fountain" (William Cowper)
"I Can See Clearly"
"Shower The People You Love"
"Two Sparrows In A Hurricane"
"Celebrate"

2003 albums
Susie McEntire albums